Conor Downey (born 12 March 1982 in Belfast) is a professional footballer from Northern Ireland and plays for Donegal Celtic.

Downey played for Carrick Rangers before joining Cliftonville in 2000. In his first spell at the club he played largely as a striker, alongside Chris Scannell. He was allowed to leave the club to join Lisburn Distillery in March 2003 on a free transfer, but returned in August 2004, reportedly only beating the transfer deadline by a matter of hours.

Upon his return to Solitude, manager Liam Beckett decided that to deploy Downey as a midfielder, and since then he has made the position his own. After a good season in 2005/06, helping Cliftonville to a 5th-placed finish, Downey attracted the interest of the likes of Glentoran and Portadown. He rejected their advances however, and opted to stay with the Reds. In January 2007 however, the BBC reported that Linfield and Derry City had made approaches for the player, at the same time he was also linked with English sides Oldham Athletic and Peterborough United F.C. and Gretna F.C. from the Scottish First Division.

Downey joined Linfield later that month and his first game for the Blues was against Portadown F.C. on 20 January 2007. Part of the deal taking him to Linfield was that Cliftonville would be allowed to use Linfield's Windsor Park ground for European games. This in turn enabled Cliftonville to obtain a UEFA licence in April 2007. He quickly established himself in the Linfield side, earning a place in the Irish League side that beat the England semi-professional side in February 2007. However, on 7 March 2007 he was ruled out for the rest of the season after a cruciate ligament injury picked up in the Setanta Cup game against Glentoran two days previously.

Rejoined Cliftonville in September 2008.

References

1982 births
Living people
Association football midfielders
Association footballers from Northern Ireland
Carrick Rangers F.C. players
Cliftonville F.C. players
Donegal Celtic F.C. players
Lisburn Distillery F.C. players
Linfield F.C. players
NIFL Premiership players